{{DISPLAYTITLE:C18H25N5O4}}
The molecular formula C18H25N5O4 (molar mass: 375.42 g/mol, exact mass: 375.1907 u) may refer to:

 Metazosin
 Neldazosin